Museo Coconut (English: Coconut Museum) is a Spanish TV sitcom which is aired in Neox since November 1, 2010.

The series revolves around the situations that happen in Coconut Museum, a museum of contemporary art. Jaime Walter (Raúl Cimas) becomes its new director, after failing as head of the MOMA in New York and in his love life. On arrival, he must deal with both the owner of the museum, Mrs. Coconut (Carlos Areces), and with their employees.

Cast
Raúl Cimas
Carlos Areces
Joaquín Reyes
Julián López
Ernesto Sevilla

References

Spanish television sitcoms
2010 Spanish television series debuts
2010s Spanish comedy television series